Strawberry Shortcake's Berry Bitty Adventures is the third incarnation of American Greetings' Strawberry Shortcake character. The very first episode of the show is "A Berry Grand Opening" which aired on March 21, 2009. The show was created by Chris Nee (creator of Doc McStuffins) and it was previewed on The Hub on October 10, 2010, and made its official premiere on October 11. It is also currently airing on Family Jr. in Canada and Discovery Kids in Latin America.

A fourth season aired on June 20, 2015 and ended on September 12 the same year.

Series overview

Episodes

Pilot (2009)
The pilot season contains 1 episode, titled "A Berry Grand Opening", of the series which was available on American Greetings' website and was later included with a certain Strawberry Shortcake doll. The film, The Strawberry Shortcake Movie: Sky's the Limit, was released on July 31, 2009 and on DVD on September 15.

Season 1 (2010)

Season 2 (2011–12)

Season 3 (2013)

Season 4 (2015)

North American DVD episode list

References

Strawberry Shortcake
Strawberry Shortcake
Strawberry Shortcake
Strawberry Shortcake